The 1979–80 season was Galatasaray's 76th in existence and the club's 22nd consecutive season in the Turkish First Football League. This article shows statistics of the club's players in the season, and also lists all matches that the club have played in the season.

Squad statistics

2nd leg Galatasaray SK – Bursa SK squad has not been added

Players in / out

In

Out

1. Lig

Standings

Matches
Kick-off listed in local time (EET)

Turkiye Kupasi

5th stage

6th stage

Quarter-final

Semi-final

Final

UEFA Cup

First round

Friendly Matches
Kick-off listed in local time (EET)

TSYD Kupası

Attendance

References

 Tuncay, Bülent (2002). Galatasaray Tarihi. Yapı Kredi Yayınları 
 1979–1980 İstanbul Futbol Ligi. Türk Futbol Tarihi vol.1. page(121). (June 1992) Türkiye Futbol Federasyonu Yayınları.

External links
 Galatasaray Sports Club Official Website 
 Turkish Football Federation – Galatasaray A.Ş. 
 uefa.com – Galatasaray AŞ

Galatasaray S.K. (football) seasons
Turkish football clubs 1979–80 season
1970s in Istanbul
1980s in Istanbul